"The Breakup Song (They Don't Write 'Em)" is a song written by Greg Kihn and Steve Wright and recorded by the American rock band The Greg Kihn Band. It is the first single from the band's sixth studio album, RocKihnRoll (1981). The song's musical style encompasses pop rock and power pop.

Meaning
It celebrates the quality of breakup songs in rock's earlier times, as the narrator laments both his recent breakup and the fact that they don't write good breakup songs anymore.

Release
The song reached No. 15 on the Billboard Hot 100 singles chart and #5 on the Billboard Top Tracks chart.

In popular culture
It has been featured in several films, including Let Me In (2010), The House of the Devil (2009), The Groomsmen (2006) and Beautiful Girls (1996) as well as the hit video game Grand Theft Auto V (2013).  It was sampled in "Gone" by Yelawolf on his Arena Rap EP. It was also featured in a season five episode of "The Sopranos". Additionally the TV show  The Nanny made a reference to the song when Fran said they don't write them like that anymore.

Track listing
 12" Maxi (AS-11506)
"The Breakup Song (They Don't Write 'Em)" - 3:42
"The Girl Most Likely" - 3:46
"Can't Stop Hurtin' Myself" - 4:30
"Valerie" - 2:44

 7" Single (B-47149)
"The Breakup Song (They Don't Write 'Em)" - 2:50
"When the Music Starts" - 2:34

Charts

Weekly charts

Year-end charts

References

1981 singles
1981 songs
Greg Kihn songs
Beserkley Records singles
Songs written by Greg Kihn